The Princely Academy of Iași was an institution of higher learning, active in the 18th and 19th centuries.

History
Founded in Iași (capital of the Principality of Moldavia) by the Prince Antioh Cantemir in 1707, the Academy symbolically continued the Academia Vasiliană, although no direct link exists between the two similar institutions. The main reformer of the Academy was Grigore III Ghica (1776), who modernised it as to compete with the European universities. The studies were done in Greek language, and for the better part of the 18th century they were basically Aristotelian. Beginning with the 1760s a series of enlightened directors introduced into the Academy the study of mathematics, natural sciences and modern philosophy, translating and adapting European handbooks.

In 1813–1819, Gheorghe Asachi lectured for the first time in Romanian language at the Academy, training a class of engineers, as the School of Surveying and Civil Engineers.

In 1821, the Academy was disestablished by order of the Sultan, following the activity of the Greek patriotic organization, Filiki Eteria. Political circumstances caused that another Academy did not exist until 1835, when the Mihaileana Academy was established. The new institution had some professors from the ancient one, so that we can trace a direct lineage between the two Academies. The Princely Academy did not offer standard academic degrees, but only diplomas that certified that the possessor was worthy of “the name of learned man”. This name gave to the bearer the possibility to hold diverse administrative offices within the Ottoman Empire and Danubian Principalities.

Notable academics
Nikephoros Theotokis (1764–1765; 1776–1777)
Iosipos Moisiodax (1765–1776)
Nicolaos Zerzoulis (Cercel) (1766–1722)
Daniel Philippidis (1784–1786; 1803–1806)
Stephanos Doungas (1813–1816)
Dimitrios Panayotou Govdelas (1808–1811; 1816–1821)

Notable alumni
Costache Conachi
George Săulescu 
Daniil Scavischi
Scarlat Sturdza
Vasile Vârnav

See also
 Princely Academy of Bucharest
 Academia Vasiliană
 Academia Mihăileană
 Alexandru Ioan Cuza University

References

Sources
Bârsănescu, Ștefan, Academia Domnească din Iași. 1714 - 1821, București : Editura de Stat Didactică și Pedagogică, 1962
Camariano-Cioran, Ariadna, Les Academies princières de Bucarest et de Jassy et leurs professeurs, Thessaloniki : Institute for Balkan Studies, 1974

History of Moldavia (1711–1822)
Alexandru Ioan Cuza University
Modern Greek Enlightenment
Educational institutions established in 1707
1707 establishments in Europe
1707 establishments in the Ottoman Empire
18th-century establishments in Moldavia
1821 disestablishments in Europe
1821 disestablishments in the Ottoman Empire
19th-century disestablishments in Moldavia
Greeks in Romania